Curwood is a surname. Notable people with the surname include:

Albert Curwood (1910–1971), English footballer
James Oliver Curwood (1878–1927), American writer and conservationist
Sarah Thomas Curwood (1916–1990), American educator, college professor, activist, and tree farmer
Steve Curwood (born 1947), American journalist, writer, radio personality, and actor